Oconomowoc is a city in Waukesha County, Wisconsin, United States. The name was derived from Coo-no-mo-wauk, the Potawatomi term for "waterfall." The population was 18,203 at the 2020 census. The city is partially adjacent to the Town of Oconomowoc and near the village of Oconomowoc Lake, Wisconsin.

History

Before 1700, this region was inhabited by Potawatomi peoples descended from Woodland Indians known as "mound builders". There are also reports that the Sauk Indian chief Black Hawk had a campsite on Oconomowoc Lake.

The first white person recorded in the area was Amable (sometimes spelled "Aumable") Vicau, brother-in-law of Solomon Juneau, one of the founders of Milwaukee. Vicau established a trading post in 1827. White settlers soon followed, beginning in 1830.

In April 1837, New York native Charles Sheldon staked a 160-acre claim on the eastern shore of what is now Fowler Lake, registering it with the Land Bank of Milwaukee on April 21, 1837. A few days later, H.W. Blanchard acquired a claim adjacent to that of Sheldon on the other side of the lake, which he later sold off to Philo Brewer. Brewer constructed what some consider to be the first residence within Oconomowoc's current legal limits, a site located at what is now 517 N. Lake Road, between La Belle and Fowler lakes. The first recorded birth was that of Eliza Jane Dewey on January 19, 1840, in the lodgings above a chair factory located at 116 N. Walnut. The first recorded death was that of Jerusha Foster, who died somewhere between the ages of 30 and 36 on March 19, 1841. Initially buried at Zion Church point, she was eventually re-interred at Nashotah Mission.

Oconomowoc was incorporated as a town in 1844, although residents had to go to Summit to get their mail until 1845. Travel and communication links between the new town and nearby cities were quickly established. The Watertown Plank Road was extended to connect Oconomowoc to the nearby towns of Milwaukee, Waukesha, Pewaukee, and Watertown in 1850. Such infrastructure encouraged further settlement, and by 1853 the town grew to a population of 250, with ten stores, three hotels, one gristmill, and one sawmill (both located near the present Lake Road bridge), and a schoolhouse. The first passenger train from Milwaukee arrived in Oconomowoc on December 14, 1854, as part of the Milwaukee and Watertown Railroad Company's rapidly expanding Milwaukee & Mississippi line.

In the 1870s, Oconomowoc started to become a summer resort town for wealthy families from the Midwest. Large houses were established around the town's lakes, particularly Oconomowoc Lake and Lac La Belle. The population grew so much that Oconomowoc incorporated as a city in 1865, and by 1880 it had a population of 3,000. In August 1899 a professional golf tournament hosted by the Oconomowoc Country Club was won by Harry Turpie.

In 2003, Oconomowoc acquired Pabst Farms from the Town of Summit. Pabst Farms, which had previously been owned by the Pabst family, is being developed as a mixture of commercial and residential property. On April 2, 2008, a gas line exploded just west of downtown, destroying the First Baptist Church on West Wisconsin Avenue. The church, which was built in 1913, was completely destroyed, except for the frame of its bell tower, which later had to be torn down as it was at risk of collapse. The source of the explosion was an old gas line that had been capped off sometime in 1972–1973; it ruptured after having been struck by a backhoe as utility work was being done on Wisconsin Avenue in preparation for reconstruction of the street.

Geography and climate

Oconomowoc is located at  (43.108814, −88.497019). It is located in the Lake Country area of Waukesha County.

Demographics

2010 census
As of the census of 2010, there were 15,759 people, 6,256 households, and 4,270 families living in the city. The racial makeup of the city was 96.0% White, 0.5% African American, 0.2% Native American, 1.0% Asian, 1.1% from other races, and 1.2% from two or more races. Hispanic or Latino of any race were 3.5% of the population.

There were 6,256 households, of which 34.8% had children under the age of 18 living with them, 56.7% were married couples living together, 8.1% had a female householder with no husband present, 3.5% had a male householder with no wife present, and 31.7% were non-families. Of all households, 27.0% were made up of individuals, and 11.4% had someone living alone who was 65 years of age or older. The average household size was 2.48 and the average family size was 3.04.

The median age in the city was 38.6 years. 26.3% of residents were under the age of 18; 5.4% were between the ages of 18 and 24; 28% were from 25 to 44; 25.5% were from 45 to 64; and 14.7% were 65 years of age or older. The gender makeup of the city was 47.7% male and 52.3% female.

2000 census
As of the census of 2000, there were 12,382 people, 4,968 households, and 3,293 families living in the city. The population density was 1,845.5 people per square mile (712.5/km2). There were 5,239 housing units at an average density of 780.9 per square mile (301.5/km2). The racial makeup of the city was 97.71% White, 0.31% Black or African American, 0.28% Native American, 0.53% Asian, 0.01% Pacific Islander, 0.47% from other races, and 0.69% from two or more races. About 1.65% of the population were Hispanic or Latino of any race.

Approximately 30.7% of households had children under the age of 18 living with them, 54.7% were married couples living together, 8.3% had a female householder with no husband present, and 33.7% were non-families. Some 28.6% of all households were made up of individuals, and 13.5% had someone living alone who was 65 years of age or older. The average household size was 2.40 and the average family size was 2.98.

In the city, the population was spread out, with 24.7% under the age of 18, 7.2% from 18 to 24, 29.5% from 25 to 44, 21.7% from 45 to 64, and 16.9% who were 65 years of age or older. The median age was 38 years. For every 100 females, there were 89.8 males. For every 100 females age 18 and over, there were 86.5 males.

The median income for a household in the city was $71,162, and the median income for a family was $89,233. Males had a median earnings of $60,998 versus $41,389 for females. The per capita income for the city was $33,418. About 1.0% of families and 2.7% of the population were below the poverty line, including 1.8% of those under age 18 and 4.9% of those age 65 or over.

Education

Oconomowoc schools are served by the Oconomowoc Area School District (OASD). Elementary schools (grades Pre-K through 4th) include: Greenland Elementary, Summit Elementary, Park Lawn Elementary, Meadow View Elementary, and Ixonia Elementary. Oconomowoc has two middle schools, Silver Lake and Nature Hill Intermediate school, which serve students in 5th through 8th grades. These opened for the 2008–2009 year, replacing the older Oconomowoc Middle School. As of the 2018–2019 school year, Oconomowoc High School had 1,715 students.

St. Matthew's Lutheran School is a Christian 3K–8 grade school of the Wisconsin Evangelical Lutheran Synod in Oconomowoc.

Holy Trinity Lutheran School is a Christian 2K–8 grade school of the Evangelical Lutheran Synod in Oconomowoc.

Transportation 
Primary automobile transportation is provided by highways 16, 67, and I-94. Highway 16 runs from Pewaukee to La Crosse. The original route passes through downtown Oconomowoc; however, a bypass was built which goes around Lac La Belle to the north. Highway 67 runs from Beloit to Chillton. Interstate 94 provides access to Madison and Milwaukee.

Rail 
Amtrak's Empire Builder passenger train passes through, but does not stop in Oconomowoc. The nearest Amtrak train station is Milwaukee Intermodal. Freight rail service is provided by the Soo Line Railroad, an American in-name-only division of the Canadian Pacific Railway.

Oconomowoc has previously had intercity passenger rail and commuter rail service at the Oconomowoc station.

Bus 
Bus routes 904 and 905, operated by Waukesha Metro Transit, has its western terminus at the Collins & Cross Parking Lot station. The service offers daily rides between Oconomowoc and Milwaukee.

In popular culture
 The Wizard of Oz premiered at the Strand Theatre in Oconomowoc on August 12, 1939.

La Belle Cemetery
La Belle Cemetery was the first cemetery in Oconomowoc. Originally called Henshall Place, it opened in 1851 on land that is now part of Fowler Park. It later moved to Walnut Street. When the grounds became overcrowded, Charles Sheldon donated land for a new cemetery, and in 1864 the Wisconsin Legislature approved the transfer of burials from Walnut Street to the current La Belle Cemetery grounds on Grove Street.

Sister cities
 Dietzenbach, Hesse, Germany

Historic landmarks 

 Milwaukee Road Depot

Notable people

 Henry M. Ackley, Wisconsin State Senator
 John M. Alberts, Wisconsin State Representative
 Jill Briscoe, Evangelical author and speaker
 Stuart Briscoe, Evangelical author and speaker; former senior pastor of Elmbrook Church, the largest church in Wisconsin
 Timothy T. Cronin, U.S. Attorney
 Dirk J. Debbink, U.S. Navy Vice Admiral, Chief of Navy Reserve
 Glenn Derby, NFL player
 John Derby, NFL player
 Steven Foti, Wisconsin politician
 Byron L. Johnson, U.S. Representative from Colorado
 Frank Tenney Johnson, painter of the Old American West
 Lucille Kailer, operatic soprano
 John Kaiser, NFL player
 Rebecca Kleefisch, former WISN-TV news anchor and Lieutenant Governor of Wisconsin (2011–2019); wife of Joel Kleefisch
 Jacki Lyden, former NPR reporter and author
 Curtis Mann, Wisconsin State Senator and businessman
 Dorothea Rudnick, embryologist
 Harry G. Snyder, Wisconsin State Representative and Wisconsin Court of Appeals Judge
 Andy Thompson, MLB player
 Jane Wiedlin, rhythm guitarist of The Go-Go's, actress
 Jack Sutte, Second trumpet of the Cleveland Orchestra

See also
 Knowllward
 Minnewoc
 Oconomowoc Lake Club

References

External links

 City of Oconomowoc
 Oconomowoc Area Chamber of Commerce

Cities in Waukesha County, Wisconsin
Cities in Wisconsin
Populated places established in 1837